Saham Toney is a village and a civil parish in the English county of Norfolk. The nearest railway station is at Attleborough for the Breckland Line which runs between Cambridge and Norwich. The nearest airport is Norwich International Airport.
For the purposes of local government, the parish falls within the district of Breckland.

History
There is evidence that Saham Toney was close to a significant Romano-British settlement. The Peddars Way footpath, partly using remaining Roman roads, passes close to the village.

The village derives part of its name from the  mere that is in the parish. The mere is well stocked with fish, especially two species of eel; one noted for its delicious, and the other for its nauseous, flavour, also one is of a peculiar shape. There are also large pike in the mere. The privately owned mere, which is dangerous, is thought to be as old as the last ice age. Access is by special permission of the owner only.

Etymology
Saham Toney derives the first part of its name from the Old English meaning homestead by the lake. However, Toney refers to the fact the land was owned by Ralph de Toeni, standard-bearer of William I, in the period shortly after the Norman conquest.

Village amenities
Amenities in the village include a public house, hotel and Parker's VC C of E Primary school attended by over 100 pupils.

The Parish Church of Saint George
The parish church of Saint George is constructed from flint and has a 15th-century tower containing six bells and a clock. The church has some very beautiful stained glass windows, the east window of the chancel portrays the Last Supper; this was a gift by the Rev. W. H. Parker, who restored the whole building at considerable expense in 1864. The nave arcades, clerestory, and part of the chancel date from the 14th century.

Notable residents 
Former British Prime Minister John Major was evacuated to the village from 1944 to 1945 as an infant during World War II.

Frank Lee Woodward (1871–1952), an English educationist, Pali scholar, author and theosophist.

References

 Office for National Statistics & Norfolk County Council, 2001. Census population and household counts for unparished urban areas and all parishes. Retrieved 2 December 2005.

Villages in Norfolk
Civil parishes in Norfolk
Breckland District